The Environmental Protection Agency (EPA) is a legal regulatory entity, working under the supervision of a governing body of Maldives under the Ministry of Environment and Energy. The EPA was formed when Environmental Research Center and Maldives Water & Sanitation Authority was merged by the president on December 18, 2008. The EPA Governing Board is a statutory body, established under the Environment Protection Act, with expertise in environment protection, industry, environmental science, regional issues, environmental law and local government.

Environment of the Maldives
Maldives
Government of the Maldives